Organised by the International Quizzing Association and held from 3 to 6 November 2016, the 2016 Quiz Olympiad in Athens was the inaugural Quiz Olympiad. Replacing the annual European Quizzing Championships, the event was open to quizzers from all over the world, with representatives of 26 nations competing.

Event 
The event hosted quizzes that combined awarded 132 medals.

Quizzes
The following were the official quizzes at the 2016 Quiz Olympiad:

Individual Quiz
Nations Team Quiz
Pairs Quiz
History Quiz
Sport Quiz
Literature Quiz
Business Quiz
Sciences Quiz
Digital Quiz
Visual Arts Quiz
Television Quiz
Geography Quiz
Film Quiz
Performing Arts Quiz
Pop Music Quiz
Pentathlon Specialist Quiz
National Specialist Quiz
High Brow Specialist Quiz
Populist Special Quiz
Speed Quiz
Knockout Quiz

Some quizzes have similar standing with IOC demonstration sports. These were awarded medals, but do not feature on the overall medals table:

Aspirational Team Quiz
World Club Team Quiz

Participants 
There were 201 participants from 26 nations at the 2016 Quiz Olympiad. Some notable participants included Nico Pattyn and Ronny Swiggers of Belgium; Dorjana Širola of Croatia; Kevin Ashman, Olav Bjortomt, Pat Gibson, Ian Bayley, David Stainer, Paul Sinha, and Jenny Ryan of England; Tero Kalliolevo of Finland; Holger Waldenberger of Germany; Anne Hegerty and Barry Simmons of Scotland; Ed Toutant, Ken Jennings, and Shane Whitlock of the United States; and David Edwards of Wales.

Medalists 
The results were:

Medal table 
The total medal table was:

References

External links 
 Official website
 International Quizzing Association

Quiz games
Student quiz competitions
Trivia competitions
Quiz Olympiad